Bärbel Körner is a West German retired slalom canoeist who competed in the 1960s and the 1970s.

She won five medals at the ICF Canoe Slalom World Championships with a gold (K-1 team: 1969), a silver (K-1 team: 1971) and three bronzes (K-1: 1965; K-1 team: 1965, 1967).

References
ICF medalists for Olympic and World Championships - Part 2: rest of flatwater (now sprint) and remaining canoeing disciplines: 1936-2007.

West German female canoeists
Possibly living people
Year of birth missing (living people)
Medalists at the ICF Canoe Slalom World Championships